Jawaharlal Nehru Rajkeeya Mahavidyalaya, Port Blair , established in 1967, is the oldest college in Port Blair, in the Andaman and Nicobar Islands, India. It offers undergraduate and postgraduate courses in science, arts and commerce. It is affiliated to Pondicherry University.

History
Jawaharlal Nehru Rajkeeya Mahavidyalaya, Port Blair was established in 1967 as Govt. College under the affiliation of the Punjab University, Chandigarh. The Islands of Andaman & Nicobar are geographically remote because of the vast distance from the mainland coastal line of India. It is the first degree college in the Union Territory of the Andaman & Nicobar Islands, which marked the beginning of higher education in this region. In 1987, the college's affiliation changed from Punjab University to Pondicherry University.

Departments

Science
Chemistry
Physics
Mathematics
Plant Science
Zoology
Computer Science
Economics
Home Science

Commerce and Arts
Commerce
English
Hindi
Tamil
Bengali
Geography
Historical Studies
Political Science
Physical Education
Tourism and Travel Management

Accreditation
The college is recognized by the University Grants Commission (UGC).

References

External links
 Jawaharlal Nehru Rajkeeya Mahavidyalaya

Education in the Andaman and Nicobar Islands
Port Blair
Monuments and memorials to Jawaharlal Nehru
Colleges affiliated to Pondicherry University
Universities and colleges in the Andaman and Nicobar Islands